Slade may also refer to:

Organizations
 Slade, an English rock band
 Slade Architecture, architecture and design firm

Fiction
 "Slade" (short story), a 1970 short story by Stephen King
 Slade Wilson, aka Deathstroke, a DC Comics villain, known only as Slade in the Teen Titans animated series
 Slade Prison, a fictional prison in Porridge

People
 Slade (surname)
 Slade Bolden (born 1999), American football player
 Slade Callaghan (born 1970), jockey in Thoroughbred horse racing
 Slade Gorton (1928–2020), American politician
 Slade Griffin (born 1991), New Zealand rugby footballer
 Slade Norris (born 1985), American football linebacker
 Slade Willis (born 1950), Canadian footballer

Places
 Slade, Kentucky, in Powell County
 Slade, Swansea, a village in Wales
 Slade, a hamlet in the civil parish of Otterden, Kent, England
 Slade, a village and townland in County Wexford, Ireland
 Slade Castle, a castle in Slade townland, County Wexford, Ireland
 Slade Avenue (Maryland), a long road primarily situated in Baltimore County, Maryland
 Slade Bay, beach near the village of Slade, south Wales
 Slade Brook, in Gloucestershire
 Slade Hall, a small Elizabethan manor house on Slade Lane in Longsight, Manchester, England
 Slade Hotel, Adrian, Minnesota, United States
 Slade (Kettering BC Ward), an electoral ward in Kettering, Northamptonshire, England
 Slade Mudstone, a geologic formation in Wales
 Slade Point (South Australia), in the locality of Sceale Bay
 Slade School of Fine Art, UK art school

Other uses
 SLADE, The Society of Lithographic Artists, Designers and Engravers, a defunct British printing industry trade union
 SLADE, a tool for editing Doom WADs